Chak Gopipur  is a village in Kapurthala district of Punjab State, India. The village is administrated by a Sarpanch, who is an elected representative.

Demography 
According to the report published by Census India in 2011, Chak Gopipur has a total number of 14 houses and population of 55 of which include 25 males and 30 females. Literacy rate of Chak Gopipur is 79.17%, higher than state average of 75.84%.  The population of children under the age of 6 years is 7 which is 12.73% of total population of Chak Gopipur, and child sex ratio is approximately  1333, higher than state average of 846.

Population data

Air travel connectivity 
The closest airport to the village is Sri Guru Ram Dass Jee International Airport.

Villages in Kapurthala

References

External links
  Villages in Kapurthala
 Kapurthala Villages List

Villages in Kapurthala district